In the U.S. state of Oklahoma, Eastern Oklahoma is an amorphous area roughly defined as east of Oklahoma City and/or east of I-35.  The Oklahoma Department of Tourism and Recreation established regional designations for the various parts of the state: Red Carpet Country (Northwest, being the Panhandle and North Central), Green Country (Northeast). Frontier Country (Central), Choctaw Country (Southeast), Chickasaw Country (South Central), and Great Plains Country (Southwest).  Eastern Oklahoma would certainly include Green Country and Choctaw Country, but depending on the exact definition might include eastern parts of Red Carpet Country (those portions of Kay and Noble counties east of I-35), Frontier Country (Payne, Lincoln, Pottawatomie, Seminole, Okfuskee and Hughes counties), and most of Chickasaw Country (Pontotoc, Johnston, and Marshall counties, plus those portions of Garvin, Murray, Carter, and Love counties east of I-35).

Eastern Oklahoma is generally considered an extension of the Mid-South and the Upland South.

See also
Green Country
Choctaw Country
Red Carpet Country
Frontier Country
Chickasaw Country

References

Regions of Oklahoma